The World Gone Mad (also released as The Public Be Hanged) is a 1933 American pre-Code crime film directed by Christy Cabanne  and starring Pat O'Brien, Evelyn Brent and Neil Hamilton. It was made on a low-budget by the independent Majestic Pictures, a Poverty Row forerunner of Republic Pictures.

Plot
When a district attorney who has been investigating a utility company's directors for fraud is suddenly killed, his wisecracking newspaperman friend (Pat O'Brien) gets curious. He and the upstanding new district attorney (Neil Hamilton) separately pursue the case. Cultivated but sinister businessmen, a shady nightclub owner specializing in "import and export", several beautiful young women always seen in evening gowns, a "Latin lover" type who reads Casanova and an abundance of suave men in evening dress provide eye-candy for the duration.

Cast
 Pat O'Brien as Andy Terrell
 Evelyn Brent as Carlotta Lamont
 Neil Hamilton as Lionel Houston
 Mary Brian as Diane Cromwell
 Louis Calhern as Christopher Bruno (as Louis Calhearn)
 J. Carrol Naish as Ramon Salvadore
 Buster Phelps as Ralph Henderson
 Richard Tucker as Graham Gaines
 John St. Polis as Grover Cromwell
 Geneva Mitchell as Evelyn Henderson
 Wallis Clark as Dist. Atty. Avery Henderson
 Huntley Gordon as Osborne

References

External links
 
 
 

1933 films
American black-and-white films
1933 crime drama films
American political drama films
Fictional companies
Films directed by Christy Cabanne
1930s crime thriller films
American crime thriller films
American crime drama films
1933 directorial debut films
1930s English-language films
1930s American films